Guanipa River is a river of north-eastern Venezuela. It flows into the Gulf of Paria.

See also
List of rivers of Venezuela

References

Sources
Rand McNally, The New International Atlas, 1993.

Rivers of Venezuela
Gulf of Paria